Hahn Rowe is an American violinist, guitarist, composer, and engineer/producer, involved in a wide range of projects. He also performs using the stage name Somatic.

Career
Originally a violinist and guitarist with New York City dream-poppers Hugo Largo, Rowe became a session player in the New York scene.

He has performed with Glenn Branca, Foetus, Swans, Ikue Mori, R.E.M., David Byrne, Michael Stipe, Firewater, That Petrol Emotion, and Moby. As drum and bass performer Somatic, he released the album, the new body (1998)

Rowe has engineered and produced recordings for Bill Laswell, Roy Ayers, Antony and the Johnsons, and Yoko Ono, among others. He produced several tracks on Hugo Largo former singer Mimi Goese's solo album, Soak.

Rowe has a long-standing collaboration with Brussels/Berlin-based choreographer Meg Stuart (Damaged Goods) which has resulted in the creation of eight evening-length dance/theater works. He has also created scores for choreographers Benoit Lachambre, Louise Lecavalier, and John Jasperse. Active as a composer for film and television, Rowe has created scores for films such as Clean, Shaven by Lodge Kerrigan, Spring Forward by Tom Gilroy, Married in America by Michael Apted, and Sing Your Song by Susanne Rostock.

Rowe is a three-time Bessie Award recipient; his 2001 Bessie Award was for musical composition.

Personal life

Rowe is based in New York City.

Discography

As Somatic
 the new body (1998, Caiprinha)

References

External links

Hahn Rowe at MySpace

1961 births
Living people
American electronic musicians
American male composers
20th-century American composers
American male violinists
Record producers from New York (state)
American audio engineers
Bessie Award winners
Firewater (band) members
Guitarists from New York (state)
American male guitarists
20th-century American guitarists
21st-century American violinists
20th-century American male musicians
21st-century American male musicians